Events from the year 1829 in China.

Incumbents
 Daoguang Emperor (9th year)

References